Jay Bowen McCallum (born June 6, 1960) is an associate justice of the Louisiana Supreme Court, and a former Democratic member of the Louisiana House of Representatives.

Education and legal career 

McCallum received his undergraduate degree from the University of Louisiana at Monroe (then Northeast Louisiana University), in 1982, and his Juris Doctor degree from the Louisiana State University Law Center in 1985.

Judicial career
McCallum was elected to the Louisiana 3rd Judicial Court in September 2002, taking office the following year. On November 3, 2020, McCallum was elected to a seat on the Louisiana Supreme Court vacated by the retirement of Justice Marcus R. Clark. McCallum assumed office on November 13, 2020.

References

1960 births
Living people
20th-century American politicians
21st-century American judges
Baptists from Louisiana
Justices of the Louisiana Supreme Court
Louisiana Democrats
Louisiana lawyers
Louisiana Republicans
Louisiana state court judges
Louisiana State University Law Center alumni
Members of the Louisiana House of Representatives
People from Bernice, Louisiana
People from Farmerville, Louisiana
Politicians from Ruston, Louisiana
University of Louisiana at Monroe alumni